European route E 35 (E 35) is a north–south European route, running from Amsterdam in the Netherlands to Rome in Italy. In the Netherlands, the highway runs from its northern terminus in Amsterdam eastwards through Utrecht and Arnhem to the German border, near Zevenaar. The road runs concurrently with three other motorways over its entire length, starting on Rijksweg 10 (A10) around Amsterdam, then A2 from southern Amsterdam up to Utrecht, and the last part on A12 until it reaches the German border in the east.

The highway is maintained by Rijkswaterstaat.

Route description

Amsterdam

E 35 begins in northern Amsterdam at an interchange with A10 / E 22 and A8 / E 22, where it runs to the south–east concurrently with A10, the orbital road around Amsterdam. The highway follows the route of A10 through eastern Amsterdam where it runs southwards under the Buiten-IJ using the Zeeburgertunnel, and then using the Zeeburgerbrug over the IJmeer, Nieuwe Diep and Amsterdam–Rhine Canal. After running across these waters, the road approaches the Watergraafsmeer interchange, where A1 / E 231 starts at its western terminus. The road continues around Amsterdam and runs westwards to the Amstel interchange just before bridging over the Amstel river. At this interchange, E 35 splits off of A10, which is also signed E 19 from this point on, and continues onto the emerging A2 southwards.

Amsterdam to Utrecht

On A2, the highway leaves Amsterdam and continues southwards to get to the Holendrecht interchange with A9. This interchange is divided into two parts, starting with a trumpet interchange, where A9 joins the road from the east, and runs for about  concurrently with it to the south. At the second part, also a trumpet interchange, A9 splits off of the road again and continues to the west. Exit 2, an incomplete exit of A2 with a northbound exit and southbound entrance to Amsterdam-Zuidoost, can be found in the latter part of this interchange. Running further southwards, the highway leaves the province of North Holland just after crossing over the Holendrecht river, and enters Utrecht. After traversing through an agricultural area and passing by the Vinkeveense Plassen in Vinkeveen, just west of the road near the interchange with Provincial road N201 (N201), E 35 / A2 runs parallel to the Amsterdam–Rhine Canal towards the city of Utrecht. Running through western Utrecht, the highway gets close to the Oudenrijn interchange with A12 / E 30 / E 25, all three approaching the interchange from the east. At this interchange E 35 joins A12 / E 30 to the east, while A2 continues southwards concurrently with E 25.

Utrecht to the German border

Concurrent with A12 / E 30, the highway runs eastwards and after some  it crosses over the Amsterdam–Rhine Canal using the Galecopperbrug. Continuing further to the east, E 35 moves towards the Lunetten interchange with A27, also labeled as E 311 to the south. At this interchange, E 30 splits off to the north, now concurrent with A27. From this point on only running with A12, the road carries on to the east, crossing the Kromme Rijn river at exit 19 near Odijk, where N229 splits off to the south. Just passed exit 20, where N225 starts its journey to the south in Driebergen, E 35 enters the Utrecht Hill Ridge, a ridge of low sandhills. Passing through this area, the highway is paralleled by the Amsterdam–Arnhem railway and both are bridged over by two wildlife crossings, the first one, the Mollebos ecoduct between exit 20 and 21, and the second one, ecoduct Rumelaar, between exit 22 and the Bloemheuvel / Oudenhorst rest area, both constructed in 2012. The road leaves the province of Utrecht and enters Gelderland between Veenendaal and Ede. After passing by Ede, E 35 enters the forest–rich ridge of the Veluwe, in which another wildlife crossing bridges over the road, the Jac. P. Thijsse ecoduct, just before exit 25, Oosterbeek, with N224. Leaving the Veluwe and now passing through Arnhem to the south–east, E 35 is provided with a Noise barrier up to the Velperbroek interchange with A348 to the north, and N325 to the south. Shortly after this interchange, river IJssel is crossed over by the road using the IJsselbrug and enters Duiven. Continuing towards the German border, the highway approaches an incomplete interchange with a southbound exit and northbound entrance only, the Oud–Dijk interchange with A18 splitting off to the north–east. After crossing the country line, E 35 in Germany enters the state of North Rhine-Westphalia, and now runs concurrently with Bundesautobahn 3 (A 3).

History

The first part of the E35 where the road is concurrent with the A10 was opened on December 6, 1989.
The first part of the E35 where the road is concurrent with the A2 was opened in May 1938.
The first part of the E35 where the road is concurrent with the A12 was opened on November 25, 1939.

Exit list

See also

References

External links

N
035
Motorways in Gelderland
Motorways in North Holland
Motorways in Utrecht (province)
Transport in Amsterdam
Transport in Utrecht (city)